Pharnaces may refer to:
 Pharnaces (fl. 550 BCE – 497 BCE), founder of the Pharnacid dynasty of satraps of Hellespontine Phrygia
 Pharnaces II of Phrygia (fl. 430 BCE – 413 BCE), satrap of Hellespontine Phrygia
 Pharnaces (Persian noble) (died 334 BCE), Persian commander in the battle of the Granicus
 Pharnaces I of Pontus (fl. 2nd century BCE), first important ruler of the kingdom of Pontus
 Pharnaces II of Pontus (died 47 BCE), the son of Mithridates VI of Pontus, he tried to reconquer Pontus, but was crushed by Julius Caesar